Türkiye Demiryolu Makinaları Sanayi A.Ş. or TÜDEMSAŞ is a rail car builder headquartered in Sivas, Turkey. The company is a government owned corporation that was founded in 1939. TÜDEMSAŞ is the main supplier of freight cars for the Turkish State Railways. The Y32 bogi was designed by TÜDEMSAŞ.

References

Rail vehicle manufacturers of Turkey
Manufacturing companies established in 1939
Sivas
Turkish companies established in 1939